The Oregon Institute for Creative Research: E4 is a school and non-profit organization located in Portland, Oregon.

References

Private schools in Oregon
Schools in Portland, Oregon
Critical theory